Alessio Tacchinardi (born 23 July 1975) is an Italian football manager and former footballer who played as a defensive midfielder, last in charge as head coach of Lecco.

He began his career with Atalanta. In 1994, he moved to Juventus, where he spent the majority of his career, winning 17 trophies; due to his success and performances with the club, Tacchinardi was one of the 50 Juventus players to have their names written inside the club's new home ground, the Juventus Stadium. Following a two-year loan spell with Spanish side Villarreal, he moved to Brescia in 2007, where he retired after a season. A former Italy international, Tacchinardi represented his nation on 13 occasions between 1995 and 2003.

Club career

Atalanta
Tacchinardi started his professional career in 1992 with Atalanta. He spent two full seasons with the Bergamo-based club, where he made 9 league appearances, including his Serie A debut. After performing extremely well, he caught the eye of then Juventus director Luciano Moggi and was transferred to Juventus in July 1994.

Juventus
Tacchinardi joined Juventus in pre-season training in 1994. In his first season with the club, Tacchinardi made 25 league appearances, and also appeared in the Coppa Italia and the European Cup. Throughout his time with the club, he formed partnerships in midfield with the likes of Antonio Conte, Paulo Sousa, Didier Deschamps, Angelo Di Livio, Edgar Davids, Gianluca Zambrotta, Mauro Camoranesi, Pavel Nedvěd, Zinedine Zidane, and Enzo Maresca. During his time with the club, Tacchinardi was noted for his work-rate, determination, and wide range of skills.

In the 2002–03 season, he scored two goals in 27 appearances, and Juventus claimed the league title. He scored two more goals in 13 UEFA Champions League appearances, a run in which Juventus reached the UEFA Champions League final, lost on penalties to Milan. With his three Champions League final defeats, Tacchinardi is the player with the most Champions League final appearances without a victory, alongside former Juventus teammates Paolo Montero and Gianluigi Buffon, although, unlike the latter two players, he did win a Champions League medal during the 1995–96 season.

After nearly 14 years with Juventus, Tacchinardi made 261 league appearances with the Bianconeri, and scored 9 goals.

Loan to Villarreal
In July 2005, Tacchinardi was transferred to Villarreal CF who signed him on one-year loan from Juventus, following the appointment of Fabio Capello, who took over the managerial position from Marcello Lippi, and also due in part to the purchases of Patrick Vieira and Federico Balzaretti. He became an integral part of the starting XI for the club, helping the team to reach the UEFA Champions League semi-finals. He returned to Juventus on 30 June 2006, but following the Calciopoli troubles he extended his loan for one more year, in July 2006. His loan finished at the end of the 2006–07 season, in which he appeared for the club in more than 50 official matches, scoring 3 goals. He returned to Juventus again in the summer of 2007, and it was believed that he would remain at the club, following the appointment of Claudio Ranieri and the club's new start, however his contract was mutually terminated in August 2007, following certain unspecified disagreements with the club's new board of directors.

Brescia
Tacchinardi signed a two-year deal with Brescia Calcio on 9 August 2007, and was a key attribute to the Serie B club's first team, appearing in all but 8 league games, and scored 11 goals. At the conclusion of the 2007–08 Serie B season, Tacchinardi did not re-new his contract with Brescia Calcio and retired.

International career
Tacchinardi also represented his nation at international level. He made his senior Italy national football team debut in a 1–0 win over Slovenia on 6 September 1995, but was also a member of the Italy under-21 team that won the 1996 UEFA European Under-21 Championship. Tacchinardi has been capped 13 official times for Italy with his last cap coming on 10 September 2003, in a 1–1 draw against Serbia and Montenegro. Tacchinardi was not a regular player for the Squadra Azzurra, never playing in the final stages of a major tournament, in several cases due to injury, but also because this was a period of many high quality Italian international midfielders. It is believed that Tacchinardi would have also been a key part of the national setup had it not been for several injuries.

Coaching career
After retiring as a player, Tacchinardi started a career as a coach. His first job was as youth coach of Pergocrema; he then went on to accept another youth coaching role at Brescia.

In 2013 he was named new head coach of Pergolettese in the Lega Pro Seconda Divisione league, however resigning soon after. Later in 2015 he returned to Pergolettese, now in Serie D.

He then took on more Serie D roles, in 2018 at Lecco and 2019 at Crema, with little success.

On 22 March 2021, Tacchinardi was appointed new head coach of Serie C club Fano. He left the club at the end of the 2020–21 season as Fano was relegated to Serie D.

On 20 June 2022, Tacchinardi agreed to return to work with Lecco in the Serie C league. He was dismissed on 17 September 2022, after only three leagues games in charge of the club.

Style of play
Tacchinardi primarily played as a central or defensive midfielder, although he was also capable of playing as a right-sided winger or wing-back. He was noted for his powerful and accurate long range shooting, as well as his striking ability from volleys, which saw him score several goals from distance during his time with Juventus. A hard-working and tenacious player, with a strong mentality and a wide range of skills, he was predominantly known for his excellent positional sense, anticipation, and tactical intelligence, as well as his tackling ability, which made effective both offensively and defensively, and also allowed him to play as a centre-back on occasion in a zonal marking defensive system. In addition to his aforementioned attributes, he also possessed good technique, vision, and passing range, which allowed him to start attacking plays quickly with long balls after winning back possession, and also enabled him to function as a deep-lying playmaker for his team.

Reception
After his retirement, Tacchinardi was included in Juventus 50 Legends whose names are written inside the club's new stadium, Juventus Stadium.

Personal life
Alessio's elder brother, Massimiliano Tacchinardi, also briefly played professional football as a defender.

Career statistics

Club

International

Honours
Juventus
 Serie A (6): 1994–95, 1996–97, 1997–98, 2001–02, 2002–03, 2004–05
 Coppa Italia: 1994–95; runner-up: 2001–02, 2003–04
 Supercoppa Italiana: 1995, 1997, 2002, 2003; runner-up: 1998, 2005
 UEFA Champions League: 1995–96; runner-up: 1996–97, 1997–98, 2002–03
 UEFA Super Cup: 1996
 Intercontinental Cup: 1996
 UEFA Intertoto Cup: 1999
 UEFA Cup runners-up: 1994–95

References

External links
 Juventus Legends: Alessio Tacchinardi
 
 Alessio Tacchinardi at Footballdatabase

1975 births
People from Crema, Lombardy
Living people
Association football midfielders
Italian footballers
Italian football managers
Italy international footballers
Italy under-21 international footballers
Italian expatriate footballers
Expatriate footballers in Spain
Italian expatriate sportspeople in Spain
Atalanta B.C. players
Juventus F.C. players
Villarreal CF players
Brescia Calcio players
Serie A players
Serie B players
La Liga players
Sportspeople from the Province of Cremona
Footballers from Lombardy
Serie C managers